Vladimir Alekseyevich Alftan (April 17 (29), 1860 - December 19, 1940) - Russian military leader, lieutenant general of the Russian Imperial Army. Military orientalist, researcher of Korea.

Biography
Lutheran religion. From the nobles of the Moscow province of Finnish origin; father - lieutenant general (since 1878) Alexei Karlovich Alftan (1814-1885).
Received general education in the Finnish Cadet Corps.

He entered service on September 1, 1879, with a rank cadet at the Nikolayev Cavalry School. On August 8, 1881, he was released as a cornet in the Life Guards of Ulan by His Majesty's Regiment. Since August 8, 1885 - lieutenant.

In 1889 he graduated from the Nikolayev Academy of the General Staff in the 1st category. On April 10, 1889, he was promoted to headquarters captain of the guard with renaming as captain of the General Staff.

From July 1, 1890 he was at the Moscow Military District, then - Senior Adjutant to the Headquarters of the 13th Army Corps.

From November 2, 1891 to November 2, 1892, the squadron qualified command passed in the 3rd Dragoon Sumy regiment.

Since April 5, 1893, he has been the headquarters officer for errands under the command of the troops of the South Ussuri department. August 30, 1893 promoted to lieutenant colonel.

Since March 6, 1895 - Senior Adjutant to the Chancellery under the Military Governor of the Primorsky Region. In December 1895 - January 1896 carried out a reconnaissance trip to the northern provinces of Korea.

Since October 28, 1896 - Senior Adjutant to the Headquarters of the Amur Military District. April 13, 1897 promoted to colonel.
Since September 21, 1897 - headquarters officer in command of the 66th Infantry Reserve Brigade. From April 1 to October 1, 1900 he was seconded to the 45th Dragoon Seversky Regiment to familiarize himself with the general requirements of management and farming in the cavalry regiment.

From May 20 to September 20, 1903 passed the qualified command of the battalion in the 16th Grenadier Mingrel regiment. December 13, 1903 was appointed commander of the 113th Starorus Russian Infantry Regiment.

Since January 3, 1904 - commander of the 77th Tenginsky Infantry Regiment. December 6, 1905 promoted to major general.
Since November 12, 1905 - General for Special Assignments under the Commander-in-Chief of the Caucasian Military District.

Since December 1, 1906 - the commandant of the Mikhailovsky fortress.

Since June 15, 1907 - the military governor of the Dagestan region. May 5, 1908 retired.

July 31, 1909 he returned from retirement with the appointment of the commander of the 1st Brigade of the 12th Infantry Division (Russian Empire). On May 9, 1914 - commander of the 1st Brigade of the 42nd Infantry Division (Russian Empire).

Since July 19, 1914 - commander of the 78th Infantry Division (Russian Empire). In January 1915 he was promoted to lieutenant general. From June 3, 1915 - the commander of the 12th Army Corps (Russian Empire), from July 5, 1915 - the commander of the 65th Infantry Division (Russian Empire), from August 22, 1915 - the commander of the 3rd Army Corps (Russian Empire).

April 16, 1917 "dismissed from service for illness with a uniform and pension." After his resignation, he was promoted to general from infantry with seniority from 1916. After 1917 he lived in the Kursk Oblast. In 1919 he was arrested by the Bolsheviks. Released after the occupation of Kursk by the troops of the FYUR. After the retreat, VSYUR ended up in Pyatigorsk. In 1922 he came to Petrograd, and later to Moscow.

In May 1923, together with his youngest son George, he left for Finland, where he was later the head of the ROVS department and chairman of the Union of Russian Military Disabled People.
He died on December 19, 1940 in Helsinki.

Awards
Order of St. Stanislav 3rd degree (1892)
Order of St. Anna, 3rd degree (1895)
Order of St. Stanislav 2nd degree (1901)
Order of St. Anna, 2nd degree (1905)
Order of St. Vladimir 3rd degree (1907)
Order of St. Stanislav 1st degree (12/06, 1911)
Order of St. George 4th degree (VP 03.02, 1915)
“For the fact that in the battle of August 13 and 14, 1914 at the station Krasne, personally managing the division entrusted to him, occupying the middle combat section of the corps, being constantly under strong enemy fire, showed excellent courage, orderliness and impulse, which resulted in the defeat of the strongly opposed enemy and the capture of 25 enemy guns, 45 charging boxes, a lot of hand weapons, cartridges, outfits and captivity of 8 officers and over 500 Austrian soldiers. "
Order of St. George 3rd degree (VP 13 March 1915)
“Because, being the head of the 78th Infantry Division (Russian Empire), he pushed the enemy’s superior forces far deeper into the Carpathian Mountains and, commanding the Stryi detachment consisting of 5 infantry and 4 Cossack regiments, occupied the Carpathian passes in the direction by January 10, 1915 Stryi - Munkach, at the front Pudpoloch - Yablonovo - Maidanka. By this time, the enemy concentrated on this front about three German and two Austrian divisions, with which he went on a decisive offensive. However, General Alftan in stubborn battles on the whole front, personally leading the detachment’s actions, for 16 days restrained the pressure of the superior enemy forces, and the detachment, due to its advanced position, had unsecured flanks. Departing under the pressure of the strongest enemy and stubbornly lingering on the opposing positions, General Alftan gave them the opportunity to concentrate sufficient forces to finally delay the further advance of the enemy and thereby preserve the northern part of the Carpathians. "
St. George's Arms (VP 11.04, 1915)
“Because in the battles near Rava-Russian from August 24 to 30, 1914 he took a number of positions ahead of Rava-Russian from the battle, covering the left flank of the enemy’s main position, which contributed to the overall success of the corps operation.

Works
Alftan V.A. General outline of the movement of 5 hunting teams of the 2nd V.-Sib. rifle brigade during an expedition to explore the Ussuri Territory in the summer of 1894. - Khabarovsk, 1895. - 40 p. - (Addendum to No. 77–82 “Amur. Vedomosti” for 1895).
Alftan V. A. Trip to Korea Gene. PCS. The regiment. Alftana in December 1895 and January 1896 // Collection of geographical, topographic and statistical materials on Asia. - Vol. 69. - S. 8-96.

Family
Wife - Sofya Dmitrievna (in the name of Mavrokordato; 1880 - June 1917, Odessa), was the daughter of the Greek general Dmitry Georgievich Mavrokordato (1849 -?) and Maria Evangelievna (in the name of Balthage; 1860 -?); Married to V.A. Alftan since 1909.
Son - Alexey (1910-1921), left Russia in 1920 with the cadet corps. He died in a camp in Slovenia.
Son - Vladimir / Voldemar (1912-1969), left Russia in 1920 with the cadet corps. In 1926 he moved to Finland. Children: Georg (born 1945) and Henrik (born 1955).
Son - George (1913-1943), in May 1923 he left with his father in Finland.

References

External links
 gazavat.ru
 Фото
 Фото
 
 Carl Johan Woldemar Alfthan

1860 births
1940 deaths
Imperial Russian Army generals
Russian military personnel of World War I
Russian emigrants to Finland
Russian people of Finnish descent
Russian nobility